Fitzroy County is one of the 141 Cadastral divisions of New South Wales. It lies south of the Orara River, and north of the Bellinger River, and includes Coffs Harbour.

Fitzroy County was named in honour of Governor of New South Wales Sir Charles Augustus Fitzroy.

Parishes within this county
A full list of parishes found within this county; their current LGA and mapping coordinates to the approximate centre of each location is as follows:

References

Counties of New South Wales